Albate-Camerlata railway station was a railway station in Italy. It is located on the Milan–Chiasso railway, and is a junction to the line to Lecco.

Services
Albate-Camerlata was served by the line S11 of the Milan suburban railway service and by the regional line Como–Molteno, both operated by the Trenord railway company. Since the time change on 13 June 2021, and the consequent opening of platforms 3 and 4 of the Como Camerlata station, the station has been closed.

See also
 Milan suburban railway service

 Line S11 (Milan suburban railway service)

Railway stations in Lombardy
Milan S Lines stations